Georgios Ioakimidis (25 July 1953 – 22 August 2017) was a Greek football midfielder and later manager.

References

1953 births
2017 deaths
Greek footballers
Panachaiki F.C. players
Ethnikos Piraeus F.C. players
Korinthos F.C. players
Greek football managers
Ethnikos Piraeus F.C. managers
Panegialios F.C. managers
Vyzas F.C. managers
Association football midfielders
Footballers from Patras